Antero Tarquínio de Quental (old spelling Anthero) (18 April 184211 September 1891) was a Portuguese poet, philosopher, and writer. De Quental is regarded as one of the greatest poets of his generation and is recognized as one of the most influential Portuguese language artists of all time. His name is often mentioned alongside Luís Vaz de Camões, Manuel Maria Barbosa du Bocage, and Fernando Pessoa.

Biography

Early life and childhood
Antero de Quental was born in Ponta Delgada on the island of São Miguel in the Azores. His family was among the oldest families of the provincial captaincy system. His father was Fernando de Quental (10 May 18147 March 1873), a veteran of the Portuguese Liberal Wars, who took part in the Landing of Mindelo. Antero's mother was Ana Guilhermina da Maia (16 July 181128 November 1876), a devout relative of Fr. Bartolomeu de Quental, founder of the Congregation of the Oratory in Portugal.

De Quental began to write poetry at an early age, chiefly, though not entirely, devoting himself to the sonnet. As a child, he took French lessons under António Feliciano de Castilho, a leading figure of the Portuguese Romantic movement, who resided in Ponta Delgada. Despite their relationship, De Quental would later criticize Castilho and other Romantic poets, sparking a divisive conflict. De Quental was seven when he was enrolled at Liçeu Açoriano, a private school where he received English lessons from Mr. Rendall, a renowned prospector on the island. In August 1852, de Quental moved with his mother to Lisbon, where he studied at Colégio do Pórtico, whose headmaster was his old tutor Castilho. When the institution closed, de Quental returned to Ponta Delgada in 1853. On writing to his old headmaster, he said:

Throughout the latter part of his life, de Quental dedicated his studies to poetry, politics, and philosophy. By 1855, at the age of 16, he had returned to Lisbon, then went to Coimbra where he graduated from the Colégio de São Bento in 1857.

Coimbra years
In the fall of 1856, he enrolled at the University of Coimbra, where he studied law and adopted socialist ideas.

He soon distinguished himself for his oral and written talents, as well as for his turbulent and eccentric nature. While in Coimbra, he founded the Sociedade do Raio, which aimed at promoting literature to the masses, and made blasphemous challenges to religion.

In 1861, de Quental published his first sonnets. Four years later, he published Odes Modernas, influenced by the Socialist Experimentalism of Proudhon, which championed intellectual revolution. During that year, a conflict (which would later be known as Questão Coimbrã) developed between the traditionalist poets and the younger students. The old guard was championed by António Feliciano de Castilho (at that time the chief living poet of the elder generation). The group of students included de Quental, Teófilo Braga, Viera de Castro, Ramalho Ortigão, Guerra Junqueiro, Eça de Queiros, Oliveira Martins, Jaime Batalha Reis and Guilherme de Azevedo, among others. Castilho accused this student group of poetic exhibitionism, obscurity, and generally a lack of good sense and taste. In response, de Quental published Bom Senso e Bom Gosto, A Dignidade das Letras, and Literaturas Oficiais in which he defended their independence. De Quental pointed to the mission of poets in an era of great transformation (the necessity to be messengers of the day's great ideological questions) and also criticized Castilho's style of poetry, labeling it ridiculous and trivial. This gave rise to the 1865 controversy known as the Questão Coimbrã (Coimbra Question). De Quental's group became known as the 70s Generation, but the ultra-romantic group of António Feliciano de Castilho did not receive a label.

Unquiet maturity
Following this controversy, de Quental traveled, engaged in political and socialist agitation, and found his way through a series of disappointments, eventually embracing a mild form of pessimism. Paradoxically, this new attitude animated his poetry and gave him new, albeit darker philosophical material. In 1866, he went to live in Lisbon, where he experimented with proletarianism and worked as a typographer at the National Press, a job that he also continued in Paris (where he went to support the French workers), between January and February 1867.

He briefly went to the United States but returned to Lisbon in 1868. In Lisbon, along with Eça de Queirós, Guerra Junqueiro, and Ramalho Ortigão, he formed Cenáculo, an intellectual group of anarchists against many of the political, social, and intellectual conventions of the day.

In 1869, de Quental founded the newspaper A República - Jornal da Democracia Portuguesa with Oliveira Martins, and in 1872, along with José Fontana, began to edit the magazine O Pensamento Social. In 1871, the year of the Paris Commune, de Quental organized the famous "Conferências do Casino", which marked the beginning of the spread of Socialist and Anarchist ideas in Portugal; in this de Quental distinguished himself as a crusader for republican ideals. He presented himself on two occasions (1879 and 1881) as a candidate for the Partido Socialista Português (Portuguese Socialist Party).

In 1873, de Quental inherited a sizable amount of money, which allowed him to live in reasonable comfort. Owing to tuberculosis the following year, he rested but returned to re-edit his Odes Modernas. He moved to Oporto, Portugal in 1879, and in 1886 published arguably his best poetic work, Sonetos Completos, which included many passages considered autobiographical and symbolic .

In 1880, he adopted the two daughters of his friend, Germano Meireles, who had died in 1877. During a trip to Paris, de Quental became seriously ill, and in September 1881, under counsel from his doctor, de Quental began residing in Vila do Conde, where he remained until May 1891 (with a few intervals in the Azores and Lisbon). He regarded his time in Vila do Conde as the best of his life. To Carolina Michaelis de Vasconcelos, a friend, he wrote of his need to end his poetry and begin a philosophical phase in his writing, to develop and synthesize his philosophy. He commented that -

In 1886, his Sonetos Completos, collected and prefaced by Oliveira Martins, was published. The Spaniard, Miguel de Unamuno, considered them "one of the greatest examples of universal poetry, which will live as long as people have memories." Between March and October 1887 he returned to the Azores, then returned to Vila do Conde.
 
In reaction to the English Ultimatum, on 11 January 1890, de Quental agreed to preside over the minor Liga Patriótica do Norte, although his involvement was short-lived. When he eventually returned to Lisbon, he stayed at the home of his sister, Ana de Quental.

Throughout his life, de Quental oscillated between pessimism and depression; afflicted with what might have been bipolar disorder, at the time of his last trip to Lisbon, he was in a state of steady depression, compounded by spinal disease. After a month in Lisbon, he returned once again to Ponta Delgada around June 1891. On September 11 that year, at about 8:00 PM, he committed suicide by two gunshots to the stomach while seated on a bench in a local garden park. He died approximately an hour later. "Of all things, the worst is having been born," he wrote in a poem.

Works

According to the Encyclopædia Britannica Eleventh Edition:

His friend Oliveira Martins edited the Sonnets (Oporto, 1886), supplying an introductory essay.  An interesting collection of studies on the poet by the leading Portuguese writers appeared in a volume entitled Anthero de Quental. In Memoriam (Oporto, 1896). The sonnets have been translated into many languages; into English by Edgar Prestage (Anthero de Quental, Sixty-four Sonnets, London, 1894), together with a striking autobiographical letter addressed by Quental to his German translator, Dr. Storck.

References

External links
 
 
 

1842 births
1891 deaths
1890s suicides
19th-century male writers
19th-century Portuguese poets
Azorean writers
People from Ponta Delgada
Portuguese male poets
Portuguese socialists
Sonneteers
Suicides by firearm in Portugal
University of Coimbra alumni
Portuguese anarchists